A motor torpedo boat is a fast torpedo boat, especially of the mid 20th century. The motor in the designation originally referred to their use of petrol engines, typically marinised aircraft engines or their derivatives, which distinguished them from other naval craft of the era, including other torpedo boats, that used steam turbines or reciprocating steam engines. Later, diesel-powered torpedo boats appeared, in turn or retroactively referred to as "motor torpedo boats" for their internal combustion engines, as distinct from steam powered reciprocating or turbine propulsion.

Though other navies built similar petrol-powered craft, the specific designation "motor torpedo boat", abbreviated to "MTB", is generally used for craft of the Royal Navy (RN) and Royal Canadian Navy boats.

During the Second World War, the US Navy built several classes of marine V-12-powered PT boat, whose hull classification symbol "PT" stood for "patrol, torpedo", but which were grouped into motor torpedo boat squadrons.<ref>{{Cite web |url=https://www.history.navy.mil/research/archives/digitized-collections/action-reports/wwii-pearl-harbor-attack/motor-torpedo-squadron-one-action-report.html |title=Motor Torpedo Squadron ONE, Report for Pearl Harbor Attack, Naval History and Heritage Command |access-date=29 February 2020 |archive-date=11 August 2020 |archive-url=https://web.archive.org/web/20200811063151/https://www.history.navy.mil/research/archives/digitized-collections/action-reports/wwii-pearl-harbor-attack/motor-torpedo-squadron-one-action-report.html |url-status=dead }}</ref> German diesel-powered torpedo boats of the Second World War were called S-boote (Schnellboote, "fast boats") by the Kriegsmarine and "E-boats" by the Allies. These large craft (well over 100 ft overall) were not known as motor torpedo boats at the time, but later have been grouped with them by some.  Italian MTBs of this period were known as Motoscafo Armato Silurante ("MAS boats", torpedo-armed motorboats). French MTBs were known as vedettes lance torpilles ("torpedo-launching fast boats"). Soviet MTBs were known as торпедные катеры (torpyedniye katyery; "torpedo cutters", often abbreviated as TKA). Romanian MTBs were known as vedete torpiloare ("torpedo fast boats").

The role of the motor torpedo boat has been absorbed in modern navies by the fast attack craft.

 History 

Torpedo boats were designed for missions that variously involved high speed, operating at night, low speed ambush, and manoeuvrability to allow them to get close enough to launch their torpedoes at enemy vessels. With no significant armour, the boats relied upon surprise and agility at high speed to avoid being hit by gunfire from bigger ships.

The Royal Navy started developing particularly small, agile, and fast petrol-powered torpedo boats in the early 20th century, shortly before the beginning of the First World War. They were joined by the Italian Navy's MAS boats, of  displacement. MAS 15 was the only motor torpedo boat in history to sink a battleship, the Austro-Hungarian vessel Szent István in 1918. In the Second World War, Britain fielded a variety of MTBs, which were operated by Coastal Forces. Diesel-powered MTBs entered the Royal Navy with the  patrol boat in 1954.

 Specifications 
Many boats were designated MTBs. A variety of designs were adopted and built.

British MTBs
The following is an incomplete list of British motor torpedo boats:

 Vosper "private venture boat" 

Commander Peter Du Cane CBE, the managing director of Vosper Ltd, designed a motor torpedo boat as a private venture in 1936. She was completed and launched in 1937. The vessel was bought by the Admiralty and taken into service with the Royal Navy as MTB 102.

 Length: 
 Beam: 
 Draft: ,
The installed powerplant of three Isotta Fraschini Asso V-18 57-litre petrol engines delivered  which gave her a speed of  light and  when carrying a full load.
 Crew: 2 officers, 10 men.
Armament was two  torpedo tubes; depth charges, machine guns and 20mm Oerlikon were trialled on her.MTB 102 was the fastest wartime British naval vessel in service. She was at Dunkirk in 1940 for the evacuation of British and French troops, where she served as Rear-Admiral Frederic Wake-Walker's flagship after the destroyer HMS Keith was sunk. She carried Winston Churchill and Dwight Eisenhower when they reviewed the fleet before the Invasion of Normandy in 1944.

 British Power Boat 60 ft MTB 
The Royal Navy ordered their first (of a total of 18) in 1936. These entered service as MTB numbers 1 to 12 and 14 to 19. In the early days of the war, they were painted with different numbers and photos distributed to the press to give the impression the Royal Navy had more than they actually did. One photo was sent to the American monthly Popular Science showing the number twenty-three.

 British Power Boat 72 ft MTB 
Initially ordered as an MGB in 1941; they were converted to MTBs (412-418, 430-432, and 534-500) from 1942 by addition of two 18-inch tubes and a 6-pdr gun. Although 10 tons heavier after conversion they still made 39 knots.

Vosper 45 ft MTB
Built as a private venture, the 45-ft MTBs were scaled down versions of larger Vosper design and intended to be carried by larger vessels. As MTB 104 to 107, these were taken up by Admiralty but found to be poor seakeeping and not used for combat.

 Vosper 70 ft MTB 
Although various boat lengths were produced by Vosper for the Royal Navy, the "70 ft" boat was produced from 1940. The design was produced with modifications as MTBs 31-40, 57-66, 73-98, 222-245, 347-362, 380-395 and 523-537.

Early models carried two  torpedo tubes, twin  machine guns in a "bin" behind the bridge and two  machine guns. They could also carry four depth charges.

The Vosper 70 was also used in other navies, such as Romania's, which acquired three in 1939, with NMS Viscolul the lead ship of the class.

 Vosper 73 ft (Type I and Type II) 

Between 1943 and 1945, the "Vosper 73ft" design appeared, the type II differed in that it carried a heavier gun armament at the expense of two torpedo tubes. The Type II did not enter service before the end of the war but was in use after the war.
Type I
 Length:  73 ft (22 m)
 Engine:  3 Packard 4M V12 engines for a total of 4,200 hp
 Speed:  
 Range:   at 
 Displacement: 47 t
 Armament:
 Four  torpedo tubes
 Oerlikon 20 mm cannon
 Two 0.303 in Vickers K machine guns (optionally two Vickers .50 machine guns)
 Crew: 13

Type II
 Length  73 ft (22 m)
 Engine  4,200 hp
 Speed  
 Range   at 
 Displacement 49 t
 Armament
 Two  torpedoes
 57mm QF 6-pdr Mark IIA gun on powered mounting
 Twin 20mm Oerlikon aft
 Two 0.303 Lewis Guns
 Crew 13

Thornycroft 75 ft MTB
The first two (MTB 24, 25) were actually 74 ft prototypes for the design ordered in 1938. Powered by three Isotti-Franschini engines they could reach 37 knots. The later ones, MTBs 49-56, had four Thornycroft RY12 engines but were too slow for operations.

J S White 75 ft MTB
A development of the Vosper designs, White had been building under sub-contract. After construction passed to Polish Navy as S5-S10.
Armed with two 18-inch torpedoes, 6-pounder gun forward, twin 20mm Oerlikon aft and two twin .303 machine gun mountings.

 Fairmile D MTB 

The Fairmile D was a very large British MTB designed by Bill Holt and conceived by Fairmile Marine for the Royal Navy. Nicknamed "Dog Boats", they were designed to combat the known advantages of the German E-boats over previous British coastal craft designs. Larger than earlier MTB or motor gun boat (MGB) designs, the Fairmile D was driven by four Packard 12-cylinder 1250 horsepower supercharged petrol engines and could achieve 29 knots (54 km/h; 33 mph) at full load. The boat carried 5,200 gallons of 100 octane fuel for a range, at maximum continuous speed, of 506 nautical miles.
Armament varied according to role but could include four 18-inch or two 21-inch torpedoes, 6-pounder and 2-pounder guns, Oerlikons, multiple machine guns and depth charges.

 Canadian MTBs 

These boats were designed by Hubert Scott-Paine for the Canadian Power Boat Company, and used by the Royal Canadian Navy 29th MTB Flotilla. Originally designed as motor gun boats (MGBs), carrying a 6-pounder (57mm, 2.24 inch) to engage enemy small craft, they were re-designated MTBs.

Scott-Paine type G 70 foot boat
 Manufacturer: British Power Boats, Hythe
 Displacement: 55 tons
 Overall length: 72 ft 6 inches (21 m)
 Breadth: 20 ft 7 inches (6.3 m)
 Draught: 5 ft 8 inches (1.7 m)
 Maximum speed:  (new)
 Armament:
 auto-loading QF 6-pounder (57mm, 2.24 inch) gun
 Two  torpedo tubes (two torpedoes)
 .303 or .50 Vickers machine guns
 20mm Oerlikon or 40 mm Bofors gun
 Powerplant – three Rolls-Royce or Packard 14M supercharged V-12 engines three shafts
 Power – 3,750 hp total
 Range –   radius of action at  

 Post-war usage 
After the end of World War II a number of Royal Navy vessels were stripped and sold for use as houseboats. These included MGBs as well as MTBs. Many of these were moored in Langstone Harbour, Littlehampton, Hayling Island and Wootton Creek, although most have now disappeared from these locations. More MTB houseboats can be found at Shoreham-by-Sea (West Sussex), Cobden Bridge (Southampton) and Bembridge (Isle of Wight).

 See also 

 Battle of Rumani Coast – battle involving MTBs in Israeli-Egyptian conflict
 Coastal Forces of the Royal Navy
 E-boat
 Fairmile D motor torpedo boat – British "dog boats"
 Fast attack craft
 HNoMS Nasty
 Motor gunboat
 Motor Launch
 Operation Agreement - operation involving MTBs in WWII
 Swift boat
 United States Nasty-class patrol boat
 Wooden boats of World War 2

 Notes 

 References 

 Dog Boats at War: A History of the Operations of the Royal Navy D Class Fairmile Motor Torpedo Boats and Motor Gunboats 1939–1945 by L. C. Reynolds and Lord Lewin, Sutton Pubns Inc, 2000, 

 External links 
 
 A Short History of HMS St Christopher
 British Military Powerboat Team
 "Midget Torpedo Boat Has Forty-Knot Speed" Popular Science, April 1934
 Database MTB-/MGB-Battles 1940-1945. Historisches Marinearchiv'' (German/English)

 
Military boats